Darren Raddysh (born February 28, 1996) is a Canadian professional ice hockey defenceman currently playing for the  Tampa Bay Lightning of the National Hockey League (NHL).

Early life
Raddysh was born on February 28, 1996, in Caledon, Ontario to warehouse manager Dwayne and accountant Gwen Raddysh. Growing up in Toronto with his brother Taylor, their father bought them rollerblades to practice shooting and skating at home. As the two were a few years apart, they played competitive lacrosse on the same teams and golfed together at the Caledon Country Club.

Playing career

Youth
Raddysh began his minor hockey career with the Toronto Marlboros Minor Midget AAA team, with whom he won the 2009 Silver Stick tournament in Michigan. During his tenure with the team, Raddysh was drafted in the fifth round, 84th overall, by the Erie Otters of the Ontario Hockey League (OHL). At the time of his selection, he stood at 5-foot-11 and weighed 165 pounds. He remained with the Marlboros for the 2012–13 season, during which he earned a call up to the Georgetown Raiders of the Ontario Junior Hockey League for seven games. Raddysh made his OHL debut with the Otters to complete their 2012-13 season, playing in 24 games and recording two assists. 

Once Taylor was drafted by the Otters, Raddysh requested that his brother lives with him since he had already completed high school. However, the team refused for they wished for Taylor to "not rely solely on his brother for direction." Raddysh remained undrafted during his tenure with the Otters but received invitations to training camps from the Los Angeles Kings and San Jose Sharks.

Raddysh re-joined the Otters for his fifth and final year in major juniors and recorded a comeback season, gaining attention from various NHL teams. Following a game against the Kitchener Rangers in January, Raddysh became the new franchise leader for points by a defenceman with 151. The following month, he set a new franchise single-season record for points by a defenceman with his 68th of the season. With his assistance, the Otters won the J. Ross Robertson Cup as the playoff champion of the Ontario Hockey League and qualified for the 2017 Memorial Cup. Alongside his brother Taylor, they became the first pair of brothers to compete against another pair of brothers (the McLeod's) in an OHL Final since 2012. As a result of his play, Raddysh became the first player in OHL history to simultaneously win the Max Kaminsky Trophy as OHL Defenceman of the Year and the Leo Lalonde Memorial Trophy as Overage Player of the Year.  The Otters competed against the Windsor Spitfires in the Memorial Cup, losing in seven games. At the end of the tournament, Raddysh was named to the 2017 Mastercard Memorial Cup All-Star Team alongside his brother. 

Raddysh concluded his major junior career on June 20, 2017, by signing a one-year American Hockey League (AHL) contract with the Rockford IceHogs.

Professional
Raddysh began his professional career with the IceHogs after making their opening night roster prior to the 2017–18 season. He recorded his first professional goal on October 15, during a 5–3 loss to the Milwaukee Admirals. On May 21, 2018, Raddysh signed a two-year contract with the Chicago Blackhawks that ran through the 2019–20 season. On February 18, 2019, Raddysh was traded to the New York Rangers in exchange for Peter Holland. After the trade he was sent to the Rangers' AHL affiliate, The Hartford Wolf Pack where after 22 games he recorded his first goal in their final regular season game against the Hershey Bears.

He attended the Rangers' training camp prior to the 2019–20 season but was reassigned to their AHL affiliate. Once the NHL began their Return to Play initiative, Raddysh was named to the Rangers' Phase 3 training camp roster.

On July 28, 2021, Raddysh signed a one-year, two-way contract with the Tampa Bay Lightning.

Raddysh made his NHL debut on December 30, 2021 against the Florida Panthers, filling one of the numerous Covid-related vacancies on the Lightning roster. In a 9–3 loss, Raddysh was on the ice for 14 minutes and 57 seconds and recorded his first NHL hit.

Career statistics

References

External links

1996 births
Living people
Erie Otters players
Hartford Wolf Pack players
Ice hockey people from Ontario
People from Caledon, Ontario
Rockford IceHogs (AHL) players
Syracuse Crunch players
Tampa Bay Lightning players
Undrafted National Hockey League players